Israel-Liberia relations refer to the bilateral relations between the State of Israel and the Republic of Liberia. Liberia was one of the United Nations member states to vote in favor of establishing a Jewish state in Palestine in 1947. Israel and Liberia established relations in the late 1950s. The administration of William Tolbert severed ties with the Israeli government in 1973 in response to the Yom Kippur War, but they were re-established in 1983 by Samuel Doe, who succeeded Tolbert via coup.

History
Before Israeli statehood, Liberian statesmen such as Edward Wilmot Blyden found parallels between the history of the Jewish people and the initial Americo-Liberian settlers, as they were both oppressed peoples that sought statehood as an escape from persecution. As such, Blyden saw similarities in the Back-to-Africa movement and Zionism. Israeli historian Yekutiel Gershoni posited that the Liberian population's Christianity gave the country a familiarity with Jewish history, particularly the Biblical account of Jewish slavery in Ancient Egypt, that helped strengthen the early bond between the countries.

Tubman administration

Liberia was one of the United Nations member states to vote in favor of statehood for Israel on 29 November 1947. Israel's first ambassador to Liberia was Ehud Avriel, who was accredited in 1957. On 9 April 1959, Israel made its first agreement with an independent African nation in its treaty of friendship with Liberia. Between 1959 and 1973, Israel and Liberia would make five more agreements. In this same period, Israel would receive one state visit from Liberia in June 1962, when President Tubman visited Jerusalem. Liberia would receive two state visits from Israel, one from President Yitzhak Ben-Zvi to Monrovia in August 1962, and one from Prime Minister Levy Eshkol in June 1966.

Israel helped to contribute to President Tubman's Open Door Policy in the late 1950s. This policy's goal was to bring economic development to Liberia's interior. This involved foreign financial investment, as well as development of its mining and agricultural industries. In the late 1950s, two surveys were conducted by Israeli experts in regard to the agricultural possibilities of Liberia. Private Israeli businesses also provided both large scale construction projects, such as with the Ducor Hotel and a new Executive Mansion, in addition to smaller projects. Israel also helped develop Liberia's medical capabilities.

President William Tubman was a proponent of Israel, and throughout his term in office, he resisted pressure from the Organisation for African Unity (OAU) to oppose Israel. In 1967, after the Six-Day War, Liberia was the first African country to move its embassy in Israel to Jerusalem.

Tolbert administration
Upon Tubman's death in 1971, he was succeeded by Vice President William Tolbert. Tolbert was not as supportive of Israel or the Western Bloc as his predecessor. He sought more relations and economic ties with Asian countries, such as the People's Republic of China, and Arab countries. Tolbert also increased Liberian identification with the Non-Aligned Movement. During the OAU summit in Rabat in June 1972, Liberia supported a resolution calling for Israel to withdraw from occupied territories acquired in the Six-Day War. On 2 November 1973, the Tolbert administration severed ties with Israel in response to the Yom Kippur War, along with 28 other African countries. While their formal relations were undone, Liberia maintained some contact with Israel through intermediates, such as private Israeli businesses and international organizations like the United Nations. While Israel–Liberia relations were worsened, Tolbert continued to support the existence of the Israeli state, and supported the continuation of Israel's status as a member state of the United Nations.

Doe administration and post-civil war relations
On 12 April 1980, Tolbert was killed in a coup d'état led by Samuel Doe, who became Liberian head of state. On 13 August 1983, Doe re-established ties with Israel. Doe visited Israel later in the month, where he supported Israel's policies in the Middle East, and called for the Palestinians to be open to peaceful discussions. Doe was the first African head of state to visit Israel after the large scale revocation of African diplomatic ties with Israel in the early 1970s. After this rekindling of relations, Liberia and Israel established security, technological, and economics ties. The two Liberian civil wars that followed Doe's execution led to another freeze on Liberia's relations with Israel.

After the civil wars, President Ellen Johnson Sirleaf made a state visit to Israel in 2007. President Sirleaf made another state visit in 2016. In March 2019, President George Weah visited Israel and met with Prime Minister Benjamin Netanyahu. On 8 June 2022, Liberia announced its intention to open a trade mission in Jerusalem which is due, over time, to become an embassy.

The current ambassador from Israel to Liberia is Shlomit Sufa, who is also accredited to Ghana and Sierra Leone.

See also
List of ambassadors of Israel to Liberia

References

Citations

Bibliography
 

 

 
Liberia
Bilateral relations of Liberia